The New York City Human Resources Administration Police (NYC HRA Police) are responsible for providing onsite security services at facilities operated by the New York City Human Resources Administration (HRA), and to enforce state and city laws at 37 facilities operated by the New York City Human Resources Administration.

The New York City Police Department respond to all incidents that occur at NYC department of Human Resources Administration facilities, they are the primary Policing and investigation agency within the New York City as per the NYC Charter (law).

See also 

 List of law enforcement agencies in New York
 Law enforcement in New York City
 Security police

References

External links
HRA bulletin

Law enforcement agencies of New York City
Specialist police departments of New York (state)